Gertse County, Gêrzê County
or Gaize County is a county located in Ngari Prefecture in the northwest of the Tibet Autonomous Region, bordering Xinjiang to the north.

Name
Gêrzê is the Tibetan word for a special type of local-style dwelling built on the peak of a mountain.

History
The area was originally inhabited by nomadic tribes.

In the aftermath of the Annexation of Tibet by the People's Republic of China in the early 1950s, People's Liberation Army troops were stationed in Gêrzê.

On May 3, 1960, the Gêrzê County Committee of the Communist Party of China was established. On October 1, 1960, the Gêrzê County government was established.

At 2:01 AM on February 21, 2020, a 5.0 magnitude earthquake struck in Gêrzê County.

At 2:12 AM on March 10, 2020, a 5.0 magnitude earthquake struck in Gêrzê County followed by a 3.7 magnitude and a 3.4 magnitude aftershock. No casualties were reported.

On May 8, 2020, eight suspects were arrested and eighty-nine antelope skins were confiscated in connection with reported Tibetan antelope poaching in the county.

Geography

Gêrzê County is bordered to the north by Keriya County (Yutian) in Hotan Prefecture (Hetian), Xinjiang and to the west by Rutog County. There are numerous lakes in Gêrzê County including Tong Tso. Thermal springs in Gêrzê County include Lugu (70 °C; ; altitude ), Nagezhong (60 °C; ; altitude ) and Yarlhaingari (60 °C; ; altitude ).

Climate
Gêrzê County has a cold semi-arid climate (Köppen climate classification: BSk), with strong dry-winter subarctic climate tendencies (Köppen: Dwc).

Administrative divisions
The only town is Gêrzê Town (Gaize;)

Townships
 Chabug Township (Chabu;), Dongco Township (Dongcuo;), Gomo Township (Gumu;), Marmê Township (Mami;), Oma Township (Wuma;) and Shenchen Township (Xianqian;).

Demographics

, the residents of the county were Tibetan. In 1999, the population of the county was 16,623.

Economy
The main economic activity in Gêrzê County is animal husbandry which includes the raising of yak, dzo, sheep, goats, and horses. The county also has wild yak, wild donkeys, wild sheep, bears and Tibetan antelope.

Transportation
Hei'agong Road

Historical maps
Historical maps including Gêrzê:

See also
 Chang Tang Nature Reserve

References

Counties of Tibet
Ngari Prefecture